Corey Thompson (born December 23, 1993) is an American football linebacker who is a free agent. He played college football at LSU.

Early life and high school
Thompson was born and raised in Missouri City, Texas and attended Elkins High School. He was a standout safety for the Knights football team and was ranked the 18th-best recruit at his position by both Rivals.com and 247Sports.com and 23rd by ESPN. Thompson initially committed to play college football at Texas A&M, but de-committed and accepted a scholarship to play for Louisiana State University after a late push by LSU coach Les Miles.

College career
Thompson was a member LSU Tigers football team for six seasons, as he was forced to redshirt his junior and redshirt senior seasons due to injury, and played both linebacker and safety for the Tigers. In his final season, Thompson recorded 43 total tackles and six sacks. He graduated with a Bachelor's degree in Sports Administration in 2015 and spent his final two years at LSU working on a Masters in Liberal Arts.

Professional career

Buffalo Bills
Thompson signed with the Buffalo Bills as an undrafted free agent on April 28, 2018. Thompson was cut from the Bills' active roster at the end of training camp and subsequently re-signed to the team's practice squad on September 2, 2018. He was promoted to the Bills' active roster on November 19, 2018. Thompson made his NFL debut on November 25, 2018 in the Bills' 24-21 win over the Jacksonville Jaguars, recording one tackle. In his rookie season, Thompson played in six games (one start) with 14 tackles, including one for loss, and a forced fumble.

On September 4, 2020, Thompson was waived by the Bills.

Hamilton Tiger-Cats
Thompson was signed by the Hamilton Tiger-Cats of the Canadian Football League to their practice roster on September 20, 2021. He was released on October 19, 2021.

New York Jets
Thompson was signed to the New York Jets practice squad on November 16, 2021. He was released on November 23.

Personal life
Thompson was born on December 23, 1993 to Tony Thompson (Shanté) and Dyan Webber. His father played wide receiver for Texas A&M and his mother was an All-American sprinter for Texas Southern University and was an alternate for the U.S.'s gold medal-winning 4 × 100 meters relay team at the 1992 Summer Olympics.

References

External links
LSU Tigers bio

Living people
1993 births
American football linebackers
Buffalo Bills players
LSU Tigers football players
New York Jets players
People from Missouri City, Texas
Players of American football from Texas
Sportspeople from Harris County, Texas